Ulrike M. Sattler  is a Professor of Computer science in the information management group of the Department of Computer Science at the University of Manchester and a visiting professor at the University of Oslo.

Education 
Sattler completed her PhD in 1998 under the supervision of Franz Baader at RWTH Aachen University in Germany.

Career and research
Sattler moved to the University of Manchester as Senior Lecturer in 2003, was promoted to reader in 2006 and then to professor in 2007. Sattler's research focuses on logic to support knowledge representation including description logic, Dynamic logic and Modal logic. She is also investigating the inference problems, complexity theory and decision procedures associated with knowledge representation. This research has been important in the development of the Web Ontology Language (OWL) and its use in bioinformatics and molecular biology.

Sattler's research has been funded by the Engineering and Physical Sciences Research Council (EPSRC). She is the co-author of the textbook An Introduction to Description Logic with Ian Horrocks, Franz Baader and Carsten Lutz.

Academic service 
Sattler serves as editor of the Journal of Logic and Computation, on the editorial board of the Journal of Automated Reasoning, and a chair for various conferences including the International Joint Conference on Automated Reasoning (IJCAR).

Awards and honours
Sattler was elected a member of the Academia Europaea (MAE) in 2014.

References 

Academics of the University of Manchester
Members of Academia Europaea
People associated with the Department of Computer Science, University of Manchester
Living people
German computer scientists
German women computer scientists
German logicians
German philosophers
Semantic Web people
Year of birth missing (living people)